Sven Manne Lavås (born 21 February 1944) is a retired Swedish speed skater. He competed in the 500 m and 1500 m events at the 1964 and 1968 Winter Olympics and finished in 16–29th place.

References

External links 
 

1944 births
Living people
Olympic speed skaters of Sweden
Speed skaters at the 1964 Winter Olympics
Speed skaters at the 1968 Winter Olympics
Swedish male speed skaters
Sportspeople from Gothenburg
20th-century Swedish people